Expressway S79 is an expressway in Warsaw acting as a spur route between the southern S2 Expressway section of the Warsaw Express Ring Road at Warszawa Południe junction and Int. Frederic Chopin Airport, ending at the junction with the inner-city Marynarska road. On a stretch between Warszawa Południe and Warszawa–Puławska junctions, S79 has concurrency with S2.

The road was completed in September 2013 and in the future will act as a major Warsaw exit route to the S7 Expressway towards Kraków.

Exit list

External links
 Warszawski węzeł komunikacyjny/obwodnica miasta

Expressways in Poland
Proposed roads in Poland